Cristóbal Rojas is one of the 21 municipalities (municipios) that makes up the Venezuelan state of Miranda and, according to a 2007 population estimate by the National Institute of Statistics of Venezuela, the municipality has a population of 96,369.  The town of Charallave is the municipal seat of the Cristóbal Rojas Municipality. The municipality is named for Venezuelan painter Cristóbal Rojas.

Demographics
The Cristóbal Rojas Municipality, according to a 2007 population estimate by the National Institute of Statistics of Venezuela, has a population of 96,369 (up from 83,568 in 2000). This amounts to 3.4% of the state's population.

Government
The mayor of the Cristóbal Rojas Municipality is Marisela Mendoza de Brito, re-elected on October 31, 2004, with 49% of the vote.  The municipality is divided into two parishes; Charallave and Las Brisas.

References

Municipalities of Miranda (state)